= Federal Medical Centre, Hong =

Health care center in Adamawa State

Coordinates: 10.2344°N 12.94654°E

Federal Medical Centre, Hong is a public health care center located in Hong, Adamawa State, Nigeria. The current Chief Medical Director is Prof. Nyandanti Yakub Wilberforce.

== History ==
In April 2022, the establishment of the Federal Medical Centre, Hong was signed into law by President Muhammadu Buhari. The emergence of this facility was an upgrade of the existing FMC outreach centre, giving room for improved healthcare access in the state. It simultaneously began clinical services for treatments and surgeries.

== Chief medical director ==
Nyandanti Yakub Wilberforce is a Nigerian professor and neurologist. He is the chief medical director of the hospital. His appointment was confirmed with effect from August 2023, under the President Bola Tinubu administration.
